Cizin is a Mayan god of death and earthquakes. He is the most important Maya death god in the Mayan culture. Scholars call him God A. 

To the Yucatán Mayas he was Hun-Came and Vucub-Came. He also has similarities to Mictlāntēcutli.

Name and etymology 
The God Cizin goes by several names like Kisen, Yom Cimil, Kisin, Ah Puch, Xibalba, Yum Cimil, Hunhau, Ah Puchah, Au Puch, Cum Hau, Eopuco, Hu Ahau, Tzontemoc, Ahpuch, and Ahal Puch. He was sometimes called Kimi. Mayans today call him Yum Cim or Yum Cimil.

The name Cizin probably means stench. Cizin comes from the root "ciz" which means flatulence. His name is said to mean Stinking One.

Yum Cimil means lord of death while Hun Ahau means one ruler. Ah Puch means to melt.

Mythology 
He is considered the brother of Nohochacyum and Bacabs.

According to Lacandon myth when a person dies Cizin burns the soul on his mouth and his anus. When the soul complains Cizin douses the soul in cold water, causing the soul to complain more leading Cizin to burn them until the soul disintegrates into nothing.

In popular culture 

Xibalba is referenced in a scene from the movie Road to El Dorado (2000) when the chief and high priest ask the protagonists to make a sacrifice to Xibalba. Later Conquistador Hernan Cortes is mistaken for the deity by the exiled high priest.

Cizin makes an appearance as a playable god in the 2014 free-to-play multiplayer online battle arena video game Smite as part of the Mayan pantheon by the name Ah Puch.

The 2013 game "9 Clues: The Secret of Serpent Creek" features Cizin as part of its supernatural mystery plot.

Ah Puch is the main antagonist in the 2018 novel The Storm Runner by J. C. Cervantes.

References 

Death gods
Maya deities
Maya mythology and religion
Underworld gods